James Ashley (21 May 1940 – 12 August 2006) was a Liberal Democrat politician in the city of Manchester, England. He was the Lord Mayor of Manchester and a councillor in the Gorton South ward.

Personal life
James Ashley was born in Manchester in 1940 and lived in Gorton, one of three sons.
He was married in 1966 and had four children. He enjoyed watercolour painting in his spare time.

Career
Ashley was appointed to the Manchester City bench in 1971 and served as a magistrate for 34 years. Ashley was the deputy president for the Manchester South Valuation Tribunal, an independent voluntary lay tribunal that resolves disputes concerning local taxes.

He made political history in 1987, becoming the first Liberal Democrat councillor to win a seat from Labour on the city council. He served as a Councillor for Gorton South from 1987 to 2006. Ashley was Lord Mayor of Manchester from 17 May 2006, to 12 August 2006. He died in office at age 66.

Achievements
Councillor Ashley was instrumental in the creation of the Gorton Heritage Trail along the  Gore Bank Valley conservation area. His voluntary work included Victim Support, Gorton Community Forum, Blackley Civic Society, Charlestown Tenants and Residents Association, and the Management Committee of Sacred Heart Community Hall. Ashley had been a member of the Manchester Chamber of Commerce and Industry's Building Section and was a member of the Northwest Regional Advisory Committee for Building and Civil Engineering.

References

Liberal Democrats (UK) councillors
1940 births
2006 deaths
Lord Mayors of Manchester